Oshin Sahakian (born March 21, 1986) is a professional Iranian basketball player of Persian and Armenian descent who plays for Petrochimi of the Iranian Super League and also the Iranian national basketball team.

Honours

National team
Asian Championship
Gold medal: 2007, 2009, 2013
Asian Games
Silver medal: 2014
Bronze medal: 2010
Asian Under-20 Championship
Gold medal: 2004
Asian Under-18 Championship
Gold medal: 2004
Silver medal: 2002
Asian Indoor Games
Gold medal: 2009

External links
FIBA
Profile

Living people
1986 births
Asian Games bronze medalists for Iran
Asian Games medalists in basketball
Asian Games silver medalists for Iran
Basketball players at the 2008 Summer Olympics
Basketball players at the 2010 Asian Games
Basketball players at the 2014 Asian Games
Ethnic Armenian sportspeople
Foolad Mahan Isfahan BC players
Iranian people of Armenian descent
Iranian men's basketball players
Mahram Tehran BC players
Medalists at the 2010 Asian Games
Medalists at the 2014 Asian Games
Olympic basketball players of Iran
Sportspeople from Isfahan
Petrochimi Bandar Imam BC players
Power forwards (basketball)
Zob Ahan Esfahan F.C. sportspeople
2014 FIBA Basketball World Cup players
2010 FIBA World Championship players